Tomești is a commune in Iași County, Western Moldavia, Romania, part of the Iași metropolitan area. It is composed of four villages: Chicerea, Goruni, Tomești and Vlădiceni.

Natives
 Dimitrie D. Pătrășcanu

References

Communes in Iași County
Localities in Western Moldavia